Barstow is a city in Ward County, in the U.S. state of Texas. The population was 349 at the 2010 census.

History

Barstow was organized in 1892 by George E. Barstow, who was one of the world's leading experts on irrigation. The same year Barstow was elected First Ward County Seat. A courthouse was built the following year, and by 1900 the city's population was over 1,000 due to the recruiting efforts of Mr. Barstow. Irrigation was successful enough that in the 1904 World's Fair, Barstow managed to win a Silver Medal for its grapes. That same year fruit and vegetable farming was hit hard when the Pecos River Dam broke. After that droughts followed and by 1918 farming was impossible. The population in 1930 was 468—less than half of the 1910s 1,219.

Geography

Barstow is located at  (31.462523, –103.395426).

According to the United States Census Bureau, the city has a total area of 0.7 square miles (1.7 km2), all of it land.

Demographics

2020 census

As of the 2020 United States census, there were 265 people, 140 households, and 88 families residing in the city.

2000 census
As of the census of 2000, there were 406 people, 146 households, and 108 families residing in the city. The population density was 607.3 people per square mile (234.0/km2). There were 175 housing units at an average density of 261.8 per square mile (100.8/km2). The racial makeup of the city was 77.09% White, 0.25% African American, 0.25% Asian, 21.43% from other races, and 0.99% from two or more races. Hispanic or Latino of any race were 78.08% of the population.

There were 146 households, out of which 28.8% had children under the age of 18 living with them, 57.5% were married couples living together, 12.3% had a female householder with no husband present, and 26.0% were non-families. 25.3% of all households were made up of individuals, and 17.8% had someone living alone who was 65 years of age or older. The average household size was 2.78 and the average family size was 3.37.

In the city, the population was spread out, with 29.3% under the age of 18, 6.4% from 18 to 24, 18.7% from 25 to 44, 23.2% from 45 to 64, and 22.4% who were 65 years of age or older. The median age was 40 years. For every 100 females, there were 114.8 males. For every 100 females age 18 and over, there were 100.7 males.

The median income for a household in the city was $15,000, and the median income for a family was $23,333. Males had a median income of $25,833 versus $12,500 for females. The per capita income for the city was $7,642. About 41.7% of families and 39.2% of the population were below the poverty line, including 50.0% of those under age 18 and 34.7% of those age 65 or over.

Education
The City of Barstow is served by the Pecos-Barstow-Toyah Independent School District.

References

Cities in Texas
Cities in Ward County, Texas